Beidler is a surname. Notable people with the surname include:

Jacob A. Beidler (1852–1912), American politician
Joe Beidler (1918–2016), American baseball player
John X. Beidler, or simply "X. Beidler", associated with the Montana Vigilantes
Philip Beidler (1944–2022), American professor of American literature, author, and editor